Azra Kanović (Azra Edina Kanović; born September 9, 1993) is a female volleyball player from Bosnia and Herzegovina, playing as a middle-blocker.

Playing for Bosnia's most successful volleyball club OK Bosna, she was a member of the Premier League of Volleyball of Bosnia and Herzegovina national championship winning team 2 times (2013, 2014) and the National Cup of Bosnia and Herzegovina winning team on 3 occasions (2012, 2013, 2014).

References

1993 births
Living people
Bosnia and Herzegovina women's volleyball players
Place of birth missing (living people)
Middle blockers